The Augusta College Historic Buildings are two former dormitory buildings built for Augusta College in Augusta, Kentucky.  Echo Hall, located on the east side of Frankfort Street, is a two-story brick building with a front-facing central gable and flanking side-gable wings.  West Hall, located on the west side of Bracken Street, is a simpler two-story brick building with a side gable roof and five-bay facade.  Both were built in the 1820s to house students at the recently established Augusta College, one of the first Methodist higher education establishments in the United States.  The school was closed in 1849.

The two buildings, now used as private residences, were listed on the National Register of Historic Places in 1980.

See also
National Register of Historic Places listings in Bracken County, Kentucky

References

University and college buildings on the National Register of Historic Places in Kentucky
National Register of Historic Places in Bracken County, Kentucky
University and college buildings completed in 1825
Education in Bracken County, Kentucky
1825 establishments in Kentucky
Augusta, Kentucky